Chittoor railway station (station code:CTO) is an Indian railway station in Chittoor city of Andhra Pradesh. It lies on the Gudur–Katpadi branch line and is administered under Guntakal railway division of South Coast Railway zone.

Classification

Chittoor railway station is classified as a B–category station in the Guntakal railway division.

References

External links

Railway stations in Chittoor district
Guntakal railway division